Luigi Monopoli (born 11 April 1992) is an Italian footballer who plays for U.S. Calcio Vigor Trani.

Biography
Born in Tritonto, the Province of Bari, Apulia, Monopoli started his career at Bari, where he was the member of under-15 team in 2005–06 season, which finished as the runner-up; U-17 in 2008–09 and the under-19 reserve from 2009 to 2011. Monopoli also received call-up to the youth teams of Italy from 2007 to 2008 and from 2009 to 2010, all friendlies and training camp. Since 2011 he left the Serie B for various third division club: Viareggio (2011–12 season), Vigor Lamezia (2012–13 season) and Paganese (2013–14 season).

Notes

References

External links
 Football.it profile 

Italian footballers
S.S.C. Bari players
F.C. Esperia Viareggio players
Vigor Lamezia players
Paganese Calcio 1926 players
Italy youth international footballers
Association football defenders
Sportspeople from the Metropolitan City of Bari
1992 births
Living people
Footballers from Apulia